The  was a professional basketball league in Japan that began in November 2005 as a six-team league. The league was operated as a competitor to the established Japan Super League which was run by the Japan Basketball Association, the official governing body of basketball in Japan. Over the next ten years the league saw continual expansion, with at least one new team joining every season, reaching 24 teams divided into two conferences in its final season in 2015–16. Turkish Airlines was the major sponsor of the 2014–15 and 2015–16 seasons.

The bj league operated on the American sports franchise system. This was in contrast to the Japan Super League and its successor, the National Basketball League, which was a corporate league composed primarily of company teams and other clubs affiliated with the JBA. There was no system of promotion and relegation between the two leagues. This division in the administration of the sport resulted in FIBA suspending the JBA from November 2014 until August 2015. As a condition of lifting the suspension, the bj league merged with the NBL and the National Basketball Development League to form the B.League.

History
The formation of the league commenced in August 2004 with an announcement by Niigata Albirex BB and Saitama Broncos that they were withdrawing their membership of the Japan Basketball Association, and the establishment of an intermediary corporation later the same month that was tasked with forming a new league. In November 2004 the formation of the bj league was officially announced, with four newly-formed clubs (Oita Heat Devils, Osaka Deinonychus, Sendai 89ers and Tokyo Apache) to join the Niigata and Saitama teams. In May 2005 the owners of the Osaka franchise faced financial difficulty and transferred their licence to the club's intended main sponsor, who instead formed Osaka Evessa. In October 2005, three weeks prior to the start of the league's first season, the league announced its first expansion, with the Takamatsu Five Arrows and Toyama Grouses to join the 2006–07 season.

The 2005–06 season was a 40-match season, with each club playing 8 matches against each other. The inaugural game occurred on November 5, 2005 at Ariake Coliseum between the Tokyo Apache and Niigata Albirex. The Apache, led by Joe Bryant won in overtime by a score of 93-90 with Darin Maki scoring the first every basket in the opening seconds. Osaka and Niigata dominated the first season of the league with 31 and 29 wins respectively; Osaka became inaugural league champions by defeating Niigata 74–64 in the championship match.

The inclusion of the Takamatsu and Toyama teams saw the league separate into 4-team Eastern and Western conferences in the 2006–07 season. Each team again played 40 matches; eight against each of the teams in their conference and four against each of the teams in the opposing conference. However, teams were ranked in a single standings table, meaning three Western Conference teams (Osaka, Takamatsu and Tokyo) and Niigata competed in the semi-finals. Osaka claimed a second championship by defeating 94–78 in the final. The season also saw the league hold its first all-star match and announce that a further two expansion teams, Rizing Fukuoka and Ryukyu Golden Kings, would join the following season.

Teams
Eastern Conference
Akita Northern Happinets (Akita Prefecture)
Aomori Wat's (Aomori Prefecture)
Fukushima Firebonds (Fukushima Prefecture)
Gunma Crane Thunders (Gunma Prefecture)
Iwate Big Bulls (Iwate Prefecture)
Niigata Albirex BB (Niigata, Niigata Prefecture)
Saitama Broncos (Saitama Prefecture)
Sendai 89ers (Sendai, Miyagi Prefecture)
Shinshu Brave Warriors (Nagano Prefecture)
Tokyo Cinq Rêves (Tokyo)
Toyama Grouses (Toyama Prefecture)
Yokohama B-Corsairs (Yokohama, Kanagawa Prefecture)

Western Conference
Bambitious Nara (Nara Prefecture)
Hamamatsu Higashimikawa Phoenix (Hamamatsu, Shizuoka Prefecture, and Higashimikawa Area, Aichi Prefecture)
Hiroshima Lightning (Hiroshima Prefecture)
Kanazawa Samuraiz (Ishikawa Prefecture)
Kyoto Hannaryz (Kyoto Prefecture)
Oita Ehime HeatDevils (Ōita city, Ōita Prefecture and Matsuyama, Ehime Prefecture)
Osaka Evessa (Osaka Prefecture)
Rizing Fukuoka (Fukuoka Prefecture)
Ryukyu Golden Kings (Okinawa Prefecture)
Shiga Lakestars (Shiga Prefecture)
Shimane Susanoo Magic (Shimane Prefecture)
Takamatsu Five Arrows (Takamatsu, Kagawa Prefecture)

Former teams
Chiba Jets (Chiba Prefecture) (Joined the NBL for the 2013–14 season)
Defunct teams
Tokyo Apache (Tokyo)
Miyazaki Shining Suns (Miyazaki Prefecture)

Expansion
The bj league had rapidly expanded since its inauguration as a six-team league in 2005. The league expanded to 22 teams for the 2014–15 season with the addition of the Fukushima Firebonds. For its final season the number increased to 24 with the addition of Kanazawa Samuraiz and Hiroshima Lightning.

Playoff champions

All-star game

Awards

Season MVP

Best 5

Slam Dunk Contest Winners
 2007: Sparks
 2008: Sparks
 2009: Simpson
 2010: Tachibana
 2011: Tachibana
 2012: Humphrey
 2013: Cunningham
 2014: Andrews
 2015: Stephens
 2016: Florveus

Three-Point Contest Winners
 2007: Garrison
 2008: Garrison
 2009: Suzuki
 2010: Okada
 2011: Okada
 2012: Aoki
 2013: Okada
 2014: Sanders
 2015: Taguchi
 2016: Taguchi

References

Basketball leagues in Japan
Defunct basketball leagues
Sports leagues established in 2005
Sports leagues disestablished in 2016
2005 establishments in Japan
2016 disestablishments in Japan